Erythrophleum is a genus of legume in the family Fabaceae. 
A partial list of species includes:
 Erythrophleum africanum
 Erythrophleum chlorostachys
 Erythrophleum couminga Baill.
 Erythrophleum fordii
 Erythrophleum ivorense
 Erythrophleum lasianthum
 Erythrophleum letestui
 Erythrophleum suaveolens
 Erythrophleum succirubrum
 Erythrophleum teysmannii

References

External links 

 
Fabaceae genera
Caesalpinioideae
Taxonomy articles created by Polbot